Gynacantha cylindrata is a species of dragonfly in the family Aeshnidae. It is found in Cameroon, Ivory Coast, Equatorial Guinea, Gabon, Ghana, Guinea, Liberia, Nigeria, Sierra Leone, Tanzania, Uganda, and possibly Somalia. Its natural habitats are subtropical or tropical moist lowland forests and shrub-dominated wetlands.

References

Aeshnidae
Insects described in 1891
Taxonomy articles created by Polbot